Dorothy Kate Richmond (12 September 1861 – 16 April 1935), known as Dolla Richmond, was a New Zealand painter noted for her watercolour paintings of natural plants and animals and panoramic landscapes.

Biography

The daughter of James Crowe Richmond and Mary Smith, Dorothy Richmond was born on 12 September 1861 at Parnell, Auckland. She was the third of five children and her young childhood was unsettled. The family moved to Nelson in 1862 where her father had become the editor of The Nelson Examiner and New Zealand Chronicle but moved to the Taranaki district after the sudden death of Dorothy's mother in 1865. Her father was often away from home and she and her siblings were farmed out to relatives before the family moved back to Nelson in around 1869.

Richmond attended Miss Bell's Young Ladies' College in Nelson and her interest in art was encouraged by her father who passed on his love of drawing and painting to her. She was taken with her two elder siblings to Europe by her father in 1873 and continued her drawing lessons. She attended Bedford College for Women in London, and also attended the Slade School of Fine Art where she worked under Alphonse Legros. By June 1880 her work gained her a Slade Scholarship.

In the early 1880s she returned to New Zealand to keep house for her father before being appointed the art mistress at the newly opened Nelson College for Girls in 1883.

Richmond exhibited with the New Zealand Academy of Fine Arts from 1885 and then travelled to Europe and returning and forth and continuing to study and paint seriously. By 1890 she had become an artist member of the New Zealand Academy of Fine Arts and by 1896 was studying with James Nairn.

She became financially independent after the death of her father in 1898 and she again travelled to Europe to paint. She met Frances Hodgkins in 1901 and travelled with her in France and Italy before returning to New Zealand together in December 1903. Hodgkins described Richmond as "the dearest woman with the most beautiful face and expression. I am a lucky beggar to have her as a travelling companion." Norman Garstin painted Richmond's portrait in Europe in 1903, and the oil painting is in the Te Papa collection, and online.

Richmond and Hodgkins remained close partners and rented a studio together in Bowen Street, Wellington where they also took on private pupils. Richmond keep the studio on after Hodgkins returned to Europe in 1906 and continued to develop her reputation as an art teacher. From around 1909 to 1924 she held classes at Fitzherbert Terrace School also known as the Samuel Marsden Collegiate School.

Richmond was a Council Member of the New Zealand Academy of Fine Arts from 1904 and was honoured with a life membership in 1928. She never married and died in Wellington on 16 April 1935.

List of works
Works by D. K. Richmond in the collection of the Museum of New Zealand Te Papa Tongarewa

References

External links
Notes from Una Platts

1861 births
1935 deaths
People from Nelson, New Zealand
Alumni of the Slade School of Fine Art
Alumni of Bedford College, London
Nelson College for Girls faculty
19th-century New Zealand painters
20th-century New Zealand painters
Atkinson–Hursthouse–Richmond family
19th-century New Zealand women artists
20th-century New Zealand women artists